Catherine Hare Williamson (13 March 1982; Bridgend, Wales) is a Welsh cyclist, a resident of Whitby, and a participant of TransCape and Giro d'Italia. She participated at the 2005, 2007, 2010 and 2011 UCI Road World Championships.

References

1982 births
Living people
Sportspeople from Bridgend
Welsh female cyclists